Leader's Questions is an Irish TV programme broadcast on RTÉ One and RTÉ News channel. It is produced by RTÉ News and Current Affairs, edited by Joe Mag Raollaigh and is presented by Sharon Ní Bheoláin. Political correspondents Micheál Lehane and Paul Cunningham also present from time to time. The programme airs every Wednesday and Thursday at around 11:45 during the Dáil term and broadcasts live proceedings from Leinster House of questions posed by opposition leaders in parliament to the Taoiseach and the Tánaiste. The programme is on air for around 60 minutes. Before and after Dáil proceedings the presenter chairs discussion and analysis with political and media figures. 

Irish television news shows
RTÉ News and Current Affairs
RTÉ original programming